Wild dog is a term broadly applied to canines which are either not domesticated or not owned. 

Wild dog may also refer to:
Feral dog, domestic dogs living as wild animals
Dingo, or Australian wild dog, a free-ranging dog found in Australia
African wild dog, or African hunting dog, wild canine of Africa
Asiatic wild dog, or Dhole, wild canine of Asia
 Wild Dog (album), a 2012 album by Susanna, also known as Susanna and the Magical Orchestra
Wild Dog (comics), a fictional vigilante appearing in DC comics
Wild Dog (film), an Indian Telugu-language film
Wild Dog (Time Crisis), a villain in the Time Crisis series of video games